Anna Neethling-Pohl (born 24 December 1906, Graaff-Reinet – died 14 August 1992, Bloemfontein) was a South African actress, performer and film producer. She was also an author who wrote under the pen name Niehausvor and sometimes Wynand du Preez. She was the first female broadcaster at the South African Broadcasting Corporation.

Biography
Anna Servasina Pohl was born in Graaff-Reinet on December 24, 1906, as the eldest of four children. She got introduced to theatre at the early age of five and participated in high school performances at Langenhoven. She participated in over 50 dramas throughout her lifetime, most of which were in Afrikaans. Among her works are translations of 7 Shakespearean dramas into Afrikaans.

Her mother died during the Great Flu Epidemic of October 1918 and the baby she expected was born dead. Two years after her death, her father married Johanna le Roux and had two sons (Pieter le Roux and Friedrich Wilhelm) from this marriage. Her father died in 1964 after his ninetieth  birthday.

She received numerous awards for her contribution to Afrikaans drama. The South African Academy of the Science and Arts and The federation of Afrikaans cultural associations were some of the prestigious institutions that honoured her.

References

External links

South African writers
1906 births
1992 deaths
People from Graaff-Reinet
South African actresses
South African film producers
Afrikaans-language writers